The Nepal Basketball League (नेपाल बास्केटबल लिग), also known as Kwiks Basketball League for sponsorship reasons, is a basketball league in Nepal, comprising 10 men's teams and 4 women's teams.

The league was founded in 2018 and held its first season in the same year. The league also introduced the Women's Nepal Basketball League from its second season in 2019.

Teams

Current Nepal Basketball League teams

Current Women's Nepal Basketball League teams

Former teams

Summary

Titles by club

Nepal Basketball League

Women's Nepal Basketball League

See also 
 Nepal national basketball team

References 

 
Sport in Nepal
Basketball in Nepal